(released as The Bélier Family in Australia) is a 2014 French-Belgian coming-of-age comedy-drama film directed by Éric Lartigau. The film received six nominations at the 40th César Awards, winning Most Promising Actress for Louane Emera. It won a Magritte Award in the category of Best Foreign Film.

An English-language remake of the film, CODA, premiered in January 2021 and won three Academy Awards, including Best Picture.

Plot 
In the Bélier family, sixteen-year-old Paula is an indispensable interpreter for her deaf parents and brother on a daily basis, especially in the running of the family farm. One day, a music teacher discovers her gift for singing and encourages Paula to audition for the prestigious Maîtrise de Radio France music college in Paris, which will secure her a good career and a college degree. However, this decision would mean leaving her family and taking her first steps towards adulthood.

Cast 

 Karin Viard as Gigi Bélier 
 François Damiens as Rodolphe Bélier 
 Éric Elmosnino as Fabien Thomasson 
 Louane Emera as Paula Bélier 
 Roxane Duran as Mathilde 
 Ilian Bergala as Gabriel Chevignon
 Luca Gelberg as Quentin Bélier 
 Mar Sodupe as Mlle Dos Santos 
 Stéphan Wojtowicz as Mayor Lapidus
 Jérôme Kircher as Dr. Pugeot 
 Bruno Gomila as Rossigneux 
 Clémence Lassalas as Karène

Box office
In cinemas, La Famille Bélier received 7,450,944 admissions, making it the second-most successful in the French box office for 2014,  
behind only Serial (Bad) Weddings. Outside of France, it received 3,877,283 cinema spectators.

The film was a commercial success, earning a reported $72,751,538 (US) worldwide against a budget of just under €11 million ($13 million US).

Deaf response
Deaf French journalist Marylène Charrière, writing for Websourd, stated: "It's good to show the larger public what it means to be deaf to use French Sign Language. Most people are unaware, thinking that it is not a true language". Conversely, her colleague Julia Pelhate stated that "What is awkward is that French Sign Language is not respected. There are many mistakes. During the preview in Toulouse, on 31 October 2014, the deaf audience needed to read the subtitles, as it could not understand what was being signed on the screen".

The British newspaper The Independent reported that "Some —but not all— activists for the deaf are angry that two well-known actors with perfect hearing were cast to play Paula's parents who are users of French Sign Language. They also complain that the deaf characters are the main source of comedy in the film." Rebecca Atkinson, writing an opinion for The Guardian, criticized the premise, "A hearing child grows up in a totally deaf farming family, only to have a talent for singing that her family can't appreciate or access." Atkinson said, "Hearing people's fascination with the relationship between music and deafness just does not resonate with most deaf people." Atkinson also criticized the casting, "The film uses hearing actors to play the roles of deaf characters, the result of which is an embarrassing and crass interpretation of deaf culture and sign language."

Accolades

Adaptations

English-language remake

The film was released in theaters and through the Apple TV+ streaming service on August 13, 2021. CODA won three Oscars at the 94th Academy Awards for Best Picture, Best Supporting Actor (Kotsur), and Best Adapted Screenplay. Among its various other accolades, the film won the Producers Guild of America Award for Best Theatrical Motion Picture and the Writers Guild of America Award for Best Adapted Screenplay, and its cast won the Screen Actors Guild Award for Outstanding Performance by a Cast in a Motion Picture.

Planned stage musical adaptation
On March 23, 2022, it was reported by The New York Times that in order to keep the film's English-language remake CODA relevance going after awards season, the film's producers will team up with Deaf West Theatre to develop a stage musical adaptation of the film, with a creative team and production calendar yet to be announced. DJ Kurs, Deaf West's artistic director, expressed excitement for the project by saying "As a Deaf person, I knew from the start that CODA would make a perfect musical: It addresses our relationship with music and how we move through the world of sound like immigrants in a foreign country, learning new, seemingly arbitrary rules on the fly." Like Deaf West's production of Spring Awakening, the musical will incorporate both signing in American Sign Language and live singing.

The report also revealed that Rousselet was originally asked in 2014 about making a stage version of La Famille Bélier prior to this incarnation, but that he and the producers wanted to prioritize making CODA and forging a relationship with Deaf West first before pursuing a stage version. Rousselet further remarked "It’s going to be a new adventure for us. But I think it has everything — the characters, the music, the wonderful environment — to make a beautiful musical." Kotsur revealed that he hopes the musical will have its initial staging within two years, possibly hinting at his return to reprise his role as Frank in the production. Kurs also revealed his desire to have Matlin and Durant also come back to reprise their roles as Jackie and Leo, respectively, along with Kotsur.

See also
List of films featuring the deaf and hard of hearing 
Khamoshi: The Musical (1996), Indian Hindi language film with same story.

References

External links 
 

2014 films
2014 comedy-drama films
Belgian comedy-drama films
Films about deaf people
2010s French-language films
French Sign Language films
French comedy-drama films
Films set in France
Films featuring a Best Actress Lumières Award-winning performance
Magritte Award winners
Films with screenplays by Thomas Bidegain
Vendôme Pictures films
2010s French films